Lee Walker (born 11 February 1976) is a Welsh former professional snooker player who is the reigning World Seniors Champion. He is both an official WPBSA and SightRight coach.

Career
After turning professional in 1994 at the age of 18, Walker reached the quarter-finals of the World Championship in 1997, with victories over Dave Harold 10–7 and Alan McManus 13–10, before he lost 13–8 to Alain Robidoux. This was the first time he had reached the latter stages of a ranking tournament, and he also reached the last 16 of the same tournament in 2004 with a 10–7 win over Stephen Lee before losing 13–5 to David Gray. He dropped off the Main Tour after the 2005–2006 season, but returned a year later after a strong campaign on the Pontin's International Open Series, from which the top 8 finishers gain Main Tour places. However he dropped off again at the end of the season.

Walker did however return to the tour in 2014 as he won a 2-year tour card by reaching the semi final stage of the second event of the 2014 Q School.

2016/2017 season
In 2016–17, he had one of his most impressive seasons to date, the highlight being his run in his home tournament, the Welsh Open. He defeated Rhys Clark, and former world champions Neil Robertson and Graeme Dott before losing in the fourth round to Zhou Yuelong.

2017/2018 season 
In the 2017–18 season, Walker had his best run in a ranking event to date, reaching the semi-finals of the 2018 Gibraltar Open where he was defeated 4–2 by eventual runner-up Cao Yupeng.

2021/2022 season 
Walker won the 2022 World Seniors Championship at the Crucible Theatre. He recovered from 0–3 down to defeat the defending champion David Lilley in the semi-finals, and then came from 1–3 and 2–4 behind to defeat three-time champion Jimmy White 5–4 in the final. Walker became the 11th different winner of the World Seniors Championship.

2022/2023 season 
Walker chose not to enter any tournament in the season, except the invitiational Champion of Champions. After losing his first round match against Mark Selby, he announced that he had already retired from all activities on the main tour, due to business and coaching obligations.

Performance and rankings timeline

Career finals

Non-ranking finals: 2 (1 title)

Pro-am finals: 2 (1 title)

Amateur finals: 4

References

External links

Lee Walker at worldsnooker.com
Profile at globalsnooker.co.uk

1976 births
Living people
Welsh snooker players
Place of birth missing (living people)
Sportspeople from Rhyl